The 1983 Texas Longhorns baseball team represented the University of Texas in the 1983 NCAA Division I baseball season. The Longhorns played their home games at Disch-Falk Field. The team was coached by Cliff Gustafson in his 16th season at Texas.

The Longhorns won the College World Series, defeating the Alabama Crimson Tide in the championship game.

Roster

Schedule 

! style="background:#BF5700;color:white;"| Regular season
|- valign="top" 

|- align="center" bgcolor="#ddffdd"
| February 18 ||  || Disch-Falk Field || 12-2 || 1-0 || –
|- align="center" bgcolor="#ddffdd"
| February 18 || Midwestern || Disch-Falk Field || 11-3 || 2-0 || –
|- align="center" bgcolor="#ffdddd"
| February 19 ||  || Disch-Falk Field || 6-10 || 2-1 || –
|- align="center" bgcolor="#ddffdd"
| February 19 || Texas–Arlington || Disch-Falk Field || 7-6 || 3-1 || –
|- align="center" bgcolor="#ffdddd"
| February 20 || Texas–Arlington || Disch-Falk Field || 5-8 || 3-2 || –
|- align="center" bgcolor="#ddffdd"
| February 20 || Texas–Arlington || Disch-Falk Field || 6-0 || 4-2 || –
|- align="center" bgcolor="#ddffdd"
| February 23 ||  || Disch-Falk Field || 13-2 || 5-2 || –
|- align="center" bgcolor="#ffdddd"
| February 23 || Texas Lutheran || Disch-Falk Field || 2-3 || 5-3 || –
|- align="center" bgcolor="ddffdd"
| February 26 ||  || Disch-Falk Field || 6-4 || 6–3 || –
|- align="center" bgcolor="ddffdd"
| February 26 || Louisiana Tech || Disch-Falk Field || 9-4 || 7–3 || –
|- align="center" bgcolor="ddffdd"
| February 27 || Louisiana Tech || Disch-Falk Field || 7-6 || 8–3 || –
|-

|- align="center" bgcolor="ddffdd"
| March 1 ||  || Disch-Falk Field || 4-1 || 9–3 || –
|- align="center" bgcolor="ddffdd"
| March 2 || Oral Roberts || Disch-Falk Field || 3-2 || 10–3 || –
|- align="center" bgcolor="ddffdd"
| March 4 ||  || Disch-Falk Field || 8-7 || 11–3 || –
|- align="center" bgcolor="ddffdd"
| March 5 || Cal State Fullerton || Disch-Falk Field || 3-1 || 12–3 || –
|- align="center" bgcolor="ddffdd"
| March 5 || Cal State Fullerton || Disch-Falk Field || 10-3 || 13–3 || –
|- align="center" bgcolor="ffdddd"
| March 7 ||  || Disch-Falk Field || 2-4 || 13–4 || –
|- align="center" bgcolor="ddffdd"
| March 7 || Lubbock Christian || Disch-Falk Field || 8-0 || 14–4 || –
|- align="center" bgcolor="ddffdd"
| March 11 ||  || Disch-Falk Field || 6–0 || 15–4 || –
|- align="center" bgcolor="ddffdd"
| March 11 || Dallas Baptist || Disch-Falk Field || 4–0 || 16–4 || –
|- align="center" bgcolor="ddffdd"
| March 12 || Dallas Baptist || Disch-Falk Field || 9–4 || 17–4 || –
|- align="center" bgcolor="ddffdd"
| March 12 || Dallas Baptist || Disch-Falk Field || 8–6 || 18–4 || –
|- align="center" bgcolor="ffdddd"
| March 14 ||  || Disch-Falk Field || 1–5 || 18–5 || –
|- align="center" bgcolor="ddffdd"
| March 14 || St. Mary's || Disch-Falk Field || 12–2 || 19–5 || –
|- align="center" bgcolor="ddffdd"
| March 16 ||  || Disch-Falk Field || 4–0 || 20–5 || –
|- align="center" bgcolor="ddffdd"
| March 16 || Emporia State || Disch-Falk Field || 14–1 || 21–5 || –
|- align="center" bgcolor="ddffdd"
| March 17 || Emporia State || Disch-Falk Field || 9–4 || 22–5 || –
|- align="center" bgcolor="ddffdd"
| March 17 || Emporia State || Disch-Falk Field || 9–5 || 23–5 || –
|- align="center" bgcolor="ddffdd"
| March 18 || Arizona State || Disch-Falk Field || 11–2 || 24–5 || –
|- align="center" bgcolor="ddffdd"
| March 18 || Arizona State || Disch-Falk Field || 6–0 || 25–5 || –
|- align="center" bgcolor="ddffdd"
| March 20 ||  || Disch-Falk Field || 4–3 || 26–5 || –
|- align="center" bgcolor="ddffdd"
| March 20 || Texas Wesleyan || Disch-Falk Field || 7–0 || 27–5 || –
|- align="center" bgcolor="ffdddd"
| March 21 || Texas Wesleyan || Disch-Falk Field || 0–3 || 27–6 || –
|- align="center" bgcolor="ffdddd"
| March 21 || Texas Wesleyan || Disch-Falk Field || 5–6 || 27–7 || –
|- align="center" bgcolor="ddffdd"
| March 22 ||  || Disch-Falk Field || 14–2 || 28–7 || –
|- align="center" bgcolor="ddffdd"
| March 22 || SE Oklahoma || Disch-Falk Field || 15–3 || 29–7 || –
|- align="center" bgcolor="ddffdd"
| March 25 || at  || George Cole Field || 9–4 || 30–7 || 1–0
|- align="center" bgcolor="ddffdd"
| March 27 || at Arkansas || George Cole Field || 6–1 || 31–7 || 2–0
|- align="center" bgcolor="ddffdd"
| March 27 || at Arkansas || George Cole Field || 11–9 || 32–7 || 3–0
|-

|- align="center" bgcolor="ddffdd"
| April 1 ||  || Disch-Falk Field || 6-5 || 33–7 || 4–0
|- align="center" bgcolor="ffdddd"
| April 2 || TCU || Disch-Falk Field || 0-1 || 33–8 || 4–1
|- align="center" bgcolor="ddffdd"
| April 2 || TCU || Disch-Falk Field || 11-9 || 34–8 || 5–1
|- align="center" bgcolor="ddffdd"
| April 5 ||  || Disch-Falk Field || 10-2 || 35–8 || –
|- align="center" bgcolor="ddffdd"
| April 5 || Hardin-Simmons || Disch-Falk Field || 7-1 || 36–8 || –
|- align="center" bgcolor="ddffdd"
| April 8 || at  || Ferrell Field || 9-2 || 37-8 || 6-1
|- align="center" bgcolor="ddffdd"
| April 9 || at Baylor || Ferrell Field || 8-0 || 38-8 || 7-1
|- align="center" bgcolor="ddffdd"
| April 9 || at Baylor || Ferrell Field || 7-2 || 39-8 || 8-1
|- align="center" bgcolor="ddffdd"
| April 15 ||  || Disch-Falk Field || 4-3 || 40–8 || 9–1
|- align="center" bgcolor="ddffdd"
| April 16 || Rice || Disch-Falk Field || 7-6 || 41–8 || 10–1
|- align="center" bgcolor="ddffdd"
| April 16 || Rice || Disch-Falk Field || 3-2 || 42–8 || 11–1
|- align="center" bgcolor="ddffdd"
| April 22 ||  || Disch-Falk Field || 12-3 || 43-8 || 12-1
|- align="center" bgcolor="ddffdd"
| April 23 || Texas Tech || Disch-Falk Field || 9-1 || 44-8 || 13-1
|- align="center" bgcolor="ddffdd"
| April 23 || Texas Tech || Disch-Falk Field || 9-2 || 45-8 || 14-1
|- align="center" bgcolor="ffdddd"
| April 29 ||  || Disch-Falk Field || 3-4 || 45-9 || 14-2
|- align="center" bgcolor="ffdddd"
| April 30 || Houston || Disch-Falk Field || 3-4 || 45-10 || 14-3
|- align="center" bgcolor="ddffdd"
| April 30 || Houston || Disch-Falk Field || 12-2 || 46-10 || 15-3
|-

|- align="center" bgcolor="ffdddd"
| May 2 || at Oral Roberts || J. L. Johnson Stadium || 6-7 || 46-11 || -
|- align="center" bgcolor="ffdddd"
| May 3 || at Oral Roberts || J. L. Johnson Stadium || 1-6 || 46-12 || -
|- align="center" bgcolor="ddffdd"
| May 6 || at  || Olsen Field || 13–4 || 47–12 || 16–3
|- align="center" bgcolor="ddffdd"
| May 7 || at  || Olsen Field || 14–11 || 48–12 || 17–3
|- align="center" bgcolor="ddffdd"
| May 7 || at  || Olsen Field || 3–0 || 49–12 || 18–3
|-

|-
! style="background:#BF5700;color:white;"| Postseason
|-

|- align="center" bgcolor="ddffdd"
| May 13 || vs. Rice || Disch-Falk Field || 4–3 || 50–12
|- align="center" bgcolor="ddffdd"
| May 14 || vs. Arkansas || Disch-Falk Field || 9–2 || 51–12
|- align="center" bgcolor="ffdddd"
| May 15 || vs. Arkansas || Disch-Falk Field || 4–5 || 51–13
|- align="center" bgcolor="ddffdd"
| May 16 || vs. Arkansas || Disch-Falk Field || 14–0 || 52–13
|-

|- align="center" bgcolor="ddffdd"
| May 19 || Lubbock Christian || Disch-Falk Field || 8–5 || 53–13 || - 
|- align="center" bgcolor="ddffdd"
| May 21 || Lubbock Christian || Disch-Falk Field || 4–3 || 54–13 || - 
|- align="center" bgcolor="ddffdd"
| May 22 || Lubbock Christian || Disch-Falk Field || 5–0 || 55–13 || - 
|- align="center" bgcolor="ddffdd"
| May 22 || Lubbock Christian || Disch-Falk Field || 9–2 || 56–13 || - 
|-

|- align="center" bgcolor="ddffdd"
| May 26 || vs.  || Disch-Falk Field || 15–0 || 57–13
|- align="center" bgcolor="ffdddd"
| May 27 || vs.  || Disch-Falk Field || 2–6 || 57–14
|- align="center" bgcolor="ddffdd"
| May 28 || vs.  || Disch-Falk Field || 7–5 || 58–14
|- align="center" bgcolor="ddffdd"
| May 28 || vs.  || Disch-Falk Field || 6–1 || 59–14
|- align="center" bgcolor="ddffdd"
| May 29 || vs. Mississippi State || Disch-Falk Field || 7–0 || 60–14
|- align="center" bgcolor="ddffdd"
| May 29 || vs. Mississippi State || Disch-Falk Field || 12–3 || 61–14
|-

|- align="center" bgcolor="ddffdd"
| June 3 || vs.  || Rosenblatt Stadium || 12–0 || 62–14
|- align="center" bgcolor="ddffdd"
| June 6 || vs. Oklahoma State || Rosenblatt Stadium || 6–5 || 63–14
|- align="center" bgcolor="ddffdd"
| June 8 || vs. Alabama || Rosenblatt Stadium || 6–4 || 64–14
|- align="center" bgcolor="ddffdd"
| June 10 || vs. Michigan || Rosenblatt Stadium || 4–2 || 65–14
|- align="center" bgcolor="ddffdd"
| June 11 || vs. Alabama || Rosenblatt Stadium || 4–3 || 66–14
|-

Awards and honors 
Billy Bates
 College World Series All-Tournament Team
 Freshman All-American

Mike Brumley
 College World Series All-Tournament Team
 First Team All-SWC

Jeff Hearron
 College World Series All-Tournament Team

Kirk Killingsworth
 First Team All-SWC

Calvin Schiraldi
 College World Series Most Outstanding Player
 First Team All-American
 First Team All-SWC

Jose Tolentino
 First Team All-SWC

Longhorns in the 1983 MLB Draft 
The following members of the Texas Longhorns baseball program were drafted in the 1983 Major League Baseball Draft.

References 

Texas Longhorns
Texas Longhorns baseball seasons
College World Series seasons
NCAA Division I Baseball Championship seasons
Southwest Conference Baseball Tournament champion seasons
Texas Longhorns baseball
Southwest Conference baseball champion seasons